Sheldon Thurlow Cooper (March 18, 1933 – February 14, 2008) was a college and professional American football player.  A tight end, he played college football at the University of Maine, and played professionally in the American Football League (AFL) as an original New York Titan in the 1960 through 1962 AFL seasons. He was drafted in 1956 by the National Football League's Cleveland Browns, but never played in the NFL.

See also

List of American Football League players

External links

1933 births
2008 deaths
Sportspeople from Augusta, Maine
Players of American football from Maine
American football tight ends
American football defensive ends
Maine Black Bears football players
New York Titans (AFL) players